Petra Schmitt (born 24 October 1971) is a Hungarian former professional tennis player.

Biography

Tennis career
Schmitt started playing professional tournaments in 1987 and featured mostly on the ITF circuit, reaching a best ranking of 419 in the world. She was a WTA Tour doubles quarter-finalist at the 1989 Belgian Open and made the singles main draw of the 1990 Athens Trophy. In 1991 she played in three Federation Cup ties for Hungary, which included a match against Magdalena Maleeva.

Finishing up on the tour in 1991, Schmitt then went to the United States to play college tennis for the USC Trojans, where she twice earned All-American honours.

Personal life
She is the daughter of Pál Schmitt, an Olympic fencer turned politician, who served as the President of Hungary from 2010 to 2012.

ITF finals

Doubles (0-1)

See also
List of Hungary Fed Cup team representatives

References

External links
 
 
 

1971 births
Living people
Hungarian female tennis players
USC Trojans women's tennis players
Children of national leaders